Lastikman is a 2003 Filipino superhero film based on the comic book character Lastikman, written and directed by Tony Y. Reyes. It stars Vic Sotto, Donita Rose, Michael V., Jeffrey Quizon, Michelle Bayle, Anne Curtis, Oyo Boy Sotto, Ryan Eigenmann, Pocholo Montes, Elizabeth Oropesa, Lito Legaspi, Evangeline Pascual, and Joonee Gamboa.

Produced by Sotto's M-ZET TV Production, Lastikman is the second film adaptation of the character, nearly 38 years from when the first adaptation, Lastik Man, was released in 1965. The film's special effects were by Tony Gapo Marbella, credited under "Special Effectsman", while its post-production was handled by RoadRunner Network.

The film was released through OctoArts Films on January 1, 2003, as part of the 28th Metro Manila Film Festival.

Plot
Larry, a physics-professor from Manila, is secretly the superhero Lastikman. A human mutant who has the ability to stretch and to shapeshift his body fantastically to great lengths and into any form he desires. He received his superpowers as a teenager when a meteorite crashed into a rubber-tree right over him. Years later he is a famous and popular superhero adored by the citizens of Manila and especially by his student Jepoy, whom he saves regularly from bullies.

When the violent bully Ryan is banned from the University after another attack, he is enraged so hard that he uses Jepoy's worship for Lastikman and lures him into a trap. Dressed up as Lastikman, he and his friends beat Jepoy almost dead. The injured Jepoy feels betrayed and turns insane. While the police believes Lastikman really beat up an innocent citizen and the media turns against him, Jepoy locks himself in his home-lab and uses some high-tech gadgets to turn into the supervillain Stryker.

Jepoy, now Stryker, attacks the bully gang and tries to kill them. Lastikman interferes but in the chaos Jepoy's friend Donna is killed. Stryker blames Lastikman and the arriving police tries to arrest him. Lastikman is able to escape with his shapeshifting power and decides to stop his superhero-activities forever.

Stryker, still furious with Lastikman, runs havoc in Manila, blowing up buildings and bridges to lure him out. The media apologize to Lastikman and Larry decides, after talking with his grandfather (who is aware of his superhero alter ego from the first day) to fight him.

Lastikman faces Stryker and in the battle, which causes huge chaos across Manila, they realize each other's identity. The shocked Stryker falls into a power-unit and falls into a coma. Lastikman is rehabilitated and the city's hero again.

Several days later Larry meets his friend Linda in a resort and confesses that he loves her, despite her crush on Lastikman. When they kiss, Larry's mouth is stretched and Linda realizes that Larry and Lastikman are the same person, which turns her very happy.

Cast

Main cast
Vic Sotto as Lastikman / Larry
Donita Rose as Linda
Michael V. as Junie Lee / Reporter
Jeffrey Quizon as Jepoy / Stryker

Supporting cast
Michelle Bayle as Korina Santos
Ryan Eigenmann as Ryan
Raven Villanueva as Donna
Wally Bayola as Wally
Elizabeth Oropesa as Mrs. Orozco
Pocholo Montes as Mr. Orozco
Joonee Gamboa as Lolo Pablo

Special participation
Oyo Boy Sotto as young Larry
Anne Curtis as young Linda
King Alcala as young Jepoy
Jane Oineza as young Donna
Joey de Leon as Elmer
Evangeline Pascual as Larry's mother
Lito Legaspi as Larry's father

Extended cast
Steven Claude Goyong as Dondi
Dindin Llarena as Mela
Nelson Evangelista as Otan
Jose Manalo as Jose
Jopay Paguia as Jopay
Minnie Aguilar as Lyme
Maureen Mauricio as Patricia
Eugene Domingo as Eva
Wahoo Sotto as Wahoo
Rudy Meyer as Gian
Nonong Bangkay de Andres as Spanky
Mike Gayoso as Erwin
Mark Vergel as Tomas
Gerald Ejercito as Nyoy
Richard Merck as Richard
Nanding Josef as Elvis
Francis Pangilinan as Senator Kiko
Val Sotto as Police Chief

Production

Development

Filming
The film was shot in Manila and its landmarks, the Manila Post Office, Manila Light Rail Transit System, Manila City Hall and the Star City.

Post-production

Accolades

See also
 Lastikman: Unang Banat
 Lastikman (TV series)

References

External links

Lastikman
2002 films
2000s superhero films
OctoArts Films films
Philippine films based on comics
Philippine superhero films
Films directed by Tony Y. Reyes